Bayshore is a census-designated place (CDP) in New Hanover County, North Carolina, United States. The population was 3,393 at the 2010 census. It is part of the Wilmington Metropolitan Statistical Area.

Geography
Bayshore is located at  (34.283713, -77.796454).

Demographics

As of the census of 2000, there were 2,512 people, 967 households, and 772 families residing in the CDP. The population density was 700.4 people per square mile (270.2/km2). There were 1,058 housing units at an average density of 295.0/sq mi (113.8/km2). The racial makeup of the CDP was 96.54% White, 1.91% African American, 0.32% Native American, 0.56% Asian, 0.04% Pacific Islander, 0.20% from other races, and 0.44% from two or more races. Hispanic or Latino of any race were 1.04% of the population.

There were 967 households, out of which 35.7% had children under the age of 18 living with them, 72.6% were married couples living together, 5.1% had a female householder with no husband present, and 20.1% were non-families. 16.5% of all households were made up of individuals, and 4.8% had someone living alone who was 65 years of age or older. The average household size was 2.60 and the average family size was 2.92.

In the CDP, the population was spread out, with 25.2% under the age of 18, 4.3% from 18 to 24, 31.1% from 25 to 44, 31.0% from 45 to 64, and 8.5% who were 65 years of age or older. The median age was 40 years. For every 100 females, there were 100.5 males. For every 100 females age 18 and over, there were 96.3 males.

The median income for a household in the CDP was $63,869, and the median income for a family was $71,815. Males had a median income of $49,286 versus $32,442 for females. The per capita income for the CDP was $24,837. About 1.9% of families and 2.0% of the population were below the poverty line, including 1.0% of those under age 18 and 2.5% of those age 65 or over.

References

Census-designated places in New Hanover County, North Carolina
Census-designated places in North Carolina
Cape Fear (region)